KBC Band is KBC Band's only album, featuring Paul Kantner, Marty Balin, and Jack Casady from Jefferson Airplane. The single "It's Not You, It's Not Me" was released shortly before the album's release.

When originally released, the album cover was printed on both the outside and inside. In one vinyl release, the inside jacket of the album had a picture of a road with a car traveling on it with sign in the distance that said: "Life is a test. Had this been a real life, you would have been told where to go and what to do" — a satire of the message broadcast by the Emergency Broadcast System.

Outtakes were included on the Marty Balin albums Balince and Nothin' 2 Lose: The Lost Studio Recordings.

Track listing
Side one
"Mariel" (Paul Kantner, Marty Balin) – 4:30
"It's Not You, It's Not Me" (Van Stephenson, Phil Brown) – 3:33
"Hold Me" (David Evan, Gene Heart) – 6:30
"America" (Kantner, Balin) – 6:18

Side two
"No More Heartaches" (Cary Sharaf) – 3:30
"Wrecking Crew" (Mark "Slick" Aguilar, Tim Gorman) – 3:42
"When Love Comes" (Heart, Evan) – 4:22
"Dream Motorcycle" (Kantner, Balin) – 3:47
"Sayonara" (Kazumasa Oda) – 4:59

Personnel
KBC Band
Paul Kantner – vocals, rhythm guitar
Marty Balin – vocals, rhythm guitar
Jack Casady – bass
Mark "Slick" Aguilar – lead guitar, background vocals
Keith Crossan – saxophone, background vocals
Tim Gorman – keyboards, background vocals
Darrell Verdusco – drums, background vocals

Additional personnel
Pete Escovedo – percussion on "Mariel"

Production
KBC Band – producer on all tracks
Jim Gaines – producer and engineer on all tracks except "Sayonara"
John Boylan – producer on "It's Not You, It's Not Me" and "Sayonara", additional production on "When Love Comes" and "No More Heartaches"
Paul Grupp – engineer on "Sayonara"
Stephen Hart, Rick Sanchez, Robert Missbach, Maureen Droney – assistant engineers
Stephen Hart – additional engineering
Frank Filipetti – mixing engineer
Moira Marquis – assistant mixing engineer
Steven Shmerler – art direction
Leon Leach – innersleeve photography
Dyer/Kahn, Inc. – design
Milton Sincoff – art production
Vincent Lynch, Lynchpin Productions – management
Cynthia Bowman – public relations
Recorded at the Plant, Sausalito and Fantasy Studios, Berkeley
Mixed at Right Track Recording, New York

Charts

Singles

References

1986 debut albums
Albums produced by John Boylan (record producer)
Arista Records albums
KBC Band albums